Anadia hobarti, also known commonly as Hobart's anadia, is a species of lizard in the family Gymnophthalmidae. The species is endemic to Venezuela.

Etymology
The specific name, hobarti, is in honor of American herpetologist Hobart Muir Smith.

Geographic range
A. hobarti is found in northwestern Venezuela, in the Venezuelan state of Trujillo.

Habitat

Reproduction
A. hobarti is oviparous.

References

Further reading
La Marca E, García-Pérez JE (1990). "A New Species of High Andean Anadia (Sauria: Teiidae) from Paramo el Riecito, Estado Trujillo, Venezuela". Herpetologica 46 (3): 275–282. (Anadia hobarti, new species).
Rivas GA, Molina CR, Ugueto GN, Barros TR, Barrio-Amorós CL, Kok PJR (2012). "Reptiles of Venezuela: an updated and commented checklist". Zootaxa 3211: 1–64. 

Anadia (genus)
Reptiles of Venezuela
Endemic fauna of Venezuela
Reptiles described in 1990
Taxa named by Enrique La Marca
Taxa named by Juan Elías García-Pérez